Islay Hospital is a community hospital in Gortanvogie Road, Bowmore, Scotland. It is managed by NHS Highland.

History
The facility has its origins in the Islay Combination Poorhouse was established on the site in 1865. It joined the National Health Service as Gortanvogie House in 1948. In the early 1960s, it was decided to replace both Gortanvogie House and the old Gartnatra Hospital with modern facilities in Gortanvogie Road; the new facilities, which were designed by Kenneth Geoffrey Ellis, opened in 1966. Dental services are provided from a portable cabin in the car park of the hospital.

References

NHS Scotland hospitals
1865 establishments in Scotland
Hospitals established in 1865
Hospitals in Argyll and Bute
Hospital buildings completed in 1966